This is a list of concert tours of South Korean girl group Mamamoo.


2018 Mamamoo Concert 4Seasons S/S

Mamamoo 1st Concert Tour in Japan

2019 Mamamoo Concert 4Seasons F/W

{{hidden
| headercss = background: #71e3d7; font-size: 100%; width: 70%;
| contentcss = text-align: left; font-size: 100%; width: 80%;
| header = Set list in Seoul, Taiwan and Hong Kong
| content =
VCR 1
 "Paint Me"
 "Starry Night"
 "Spring Fever"
VCR 2
  "Rainy Season"
 "Egotistic"
 "No more drama"
 "Wind Flower"
VCR 3
  "Better than I thought"
 "My star"
 "gogobebe"
VCR 4
  "SELFISH" (Moonbyul Solo)
 TVXQ Song Medley - "I Believe", "Hug", "The Way U Are", "Before U Go", "Rising Sun" (Moonbyul Solo)
 Korean Drum Dance (Moonbyul Solo)
 "Moon Movie" (Moonbyul Solo)
 "25" (Wheein Solo)
 Waltz Dance (Wheein Solo)
 "7 rings"  (Wheein Solo)
 "Be Like Me"  (Wheein Solo)
 "Runaway Baby"  (Wheein Solo)
 "Drum" (Wheein Solo)
 "Crazy in Love"  (Hwasa Solo)
 "Orange Colored Sky"  (Hwasa Solo)
 "You da One"  (Hwasa Solo)
 "I Do Me" (Hwasa Solo)
 "Mr. Ambiguous" (Hwasa Solo)
 "You're the Best" (Hwasa Solo)
 "Be Calm" (Hwasa Solo)
 "Don't" (Hwasa Solo)
 "Twit" (Hwasa Solo)
 "My Heart Will Go On"  (Solar Solo)
 "Hello" (Solar Solo)
 "Fever"  (Solar Solo)
 "Shut Up and Let Me Go"  (Solar Solo)
 "Fire"  (Solar Solo)
VCR 5
  "Taller than You"
 "Waggy"
VCR 6
  "I Love Too"
 "Star Wind Flower Sun"
 "Um Oh Ah Yeh" (Acapella Ver.)
 "Décalcomanie"
 "Yes I Am"
VCR 6
  "You're the Best"
 "Mr. Ambiguous"
}}

{{hidden
| headercss = background: #71e3d7; font-size: 100%; width: 70%;
| contentcss = text-align: left; font-size: 100%; width: 80%;
| header = Set list in Daegu
| content =
VCR 1
 "Starry Night"
 "Rainy Season"
 "Egotistic"
 "Gleam"
VCR 2
  "No more drama"
 "Wind Flower"
VCR 3
  "Better than I thought"
 "My star"
 "Gogobebe"
VCR 4
  "SELFISH" (Moonbyul Solo)
 TVXQ Song Medley - "I Believe", "Hug", "The Way U Are", "Before U Go", "Rising Sun" (Moonbyul Solo)
 Korean Drum Dance (Moonbyul Solo)
 "Moon Movie" (Moonbyul Solo)
 "25" (Wheein Solo)
 Waltz Dance (Wheein Solo)
 "7 rings"  (Wheein Solo)
 "Be Like Me"  (Wheein Solo)
 "Runaway Baby"  (Wheein Solo)
 Drum (Wheein Solo)
 "Crazy in Love"  (Hwasa Solo)
 "Orange Colored Sky"  (Hwasa Solo)
 "You da One"  (Hwasa Solo)
 "I Do Me" (Hwasa Solo)
 "Mr. Ambiguous" (Hwasa Solo)
 "You're the Best" (Hwasa Solo)
 "Be Calm" (Hwasa Solo)
 "Don't" (Hwasa Solo)
 "Twit" (Hwasa Solo)
 "My Heart Will Go On"  (Solar Solo)
 "Hello" (Solar Solo)
 "Fever"  (Solar Solo)
 "Shut Up and Let Me Go"  (Solar Solo)
 "Fire"  (Solar Solo)
 Immortal Songs: Singing the Legend – "Backwoods", "Love Story Of A Girl", T"he Way to Sanpo", "You", "In My Fading Memories", "Wonderful Confession", "Flying into the Night Sky"
 "I Love Too"
 "Star Wind Flower Sun"
 "I'm Your Fan"
 "Décalcomanie"
 "Yes I Am"
VCR 5
  "Words Don't Come Easy"
 "Um Oh Ah Yeh"
}}

Mamamoo 2nd Concert Tour in Japan: 4season Final

Mamamoo World Tour "My Con"
Mamamoo's My Con World Tour was announced on October 12, 2022, beginning with a three-day at the Olympic Hall in Seoul followed by two shows in Japan. Ticket sales for the concerts opened a week later. On November 16, additional dates for the tour were added in Hong Kong, Singapore, Malaysia and the Philippines.

Concerts

2016 Mamamoo Concert Moosical

2016 Mamamoo Concert Moosical was the first solo concert by Mamamoo after 2 years of debut, setting a new record of being the earliest solo concert among all girl groups. It was held on August 13 and 14, 2016 at Olympic Hall in Olympic Park, Seoul, to commemorate their 2nd anniversary. The name of the concert has the meaning of showing a wonderful musical performance starring Mamamoo. Tickets to the show were sold out in less than a minute after opening to the public on June 22.

2017 Mamamoo Concert Moosical: Curtain Call

2017 Mamamoo Concert Moosical: Curtain Call is the second concert held by Mamamoo in 7 months since their first solo concert held in August 2016. The concert is an upgraded version of Moosical and plans to present a differentiated stage with a more colorful repertoire and performances. The concert was held at Olympic Hall from March 3 to 5, 2017, and later at KBS Busan Hall from August 19 to 20, 2017. All 10,000 tickets to the concert in Seoul was sold out in 1 minute.

2018 Mamamoo 4season S/S Concert Tour

2018 Mamamoo 4season S/S Concert Tour was held after a year of their 2017 concert. The concerts were held from August 18 to September 2.

Virtual concerts
 Moomoo Tour: "Best friend, Best Travel" (2021)
 LiveNOW K-Pop Presents: Mamamoo (2021)
 2021 Mamamoo Online Concert 'WAW' (2021)

References

L
K-pop concerts by artist
Lists of concert tours
Lists of concert tours of South Korean artists
Lists of events in South Korea
South Korean music-related lists